Joey Field (born 19 December 2000) is a New Zealand cricketer. He made his first-class debut on 28 October 2020, for Central Districts in the 2020–21 Plunket Shield season. Prior to his first-class debut, he was named in New Zealand's squad for the 2020 Under-19 Cricket World Cup. He made his List A debut on 29 November 2020, for Central Districts in the 2020–21 Ford Trophy. He made his Twenty20 debut on 27 December 2020, for Central Districts in the 2020–21 Super Smash.

References

External links
 

2000 births
Living people
New Zealand cricketers
Central Districts cricketers
Place of birth missing (living people)